The men's large hill team ski jumping competition for the 1992 Winter Olympics was held at Tremplin du Praz.  The competition took place on 14 February.

Results

References

Ski jumping at the 1992 Winter Olympics